The 2012 WTA Tour is the elite professional tennis circuit organized by the Women's Tennis Association (WTA) for the 2012 tennis season. The 2012 WTA Tour calendar comprises the Grand Slam tournaments (supervised by the International Tennis Federation (ITF)), the WTA Premier tournaments (Premier Mandatory, Premier 5, and regular Premier), the WTA International tournaments, the Fed Cup (organized by the ITF), the year-end championships (the WTA Tour Championships and the WTA Tournament of Champions), and the tennis event at the Summer Olympic Games. Also included in the 2012 calendar is the Hopman Cup, which is organized by the ITF and does not distribute ranking points.

Schedule
This is the complete schedule of events on the 2012 calendar, with player progression documented from the quarterfinals stage.

Key

January

February

March

April

May

June

July

August

September

October

Statistical information
These tables present the number of singles (S), doubles (D), and mixed doubles (X) titles won by each player and each nation during the season, within all the tournament categories of the 2012 WTA Tour: the Grand Slam tournaments, the tennis event at the London Summer Olympic Games, the year-end championships (the WTA Tour Championships and the Tournament of Champions), the WTA Premier tournaments (Premier Mandatory, Premier 5, and regular Premier), and the WTA International tournaments. The players/nations are sorted by: 1) total number of titles (a doubles title won by two players representing the same nation counts as only one win for the nation); 2) cumulated importance of those titles (one Grand Slam win equalling two Premier Mandatory/Premier 5 wins, one year-end championships win equalling one-and-a-half Premier Mandatory/Premier 5 win, one Premier Mandatory/Premier 5 win equalling two Premier wins, one Olympic win equalling one-and-a-half Premier win, one Premier win equalling two International wins); 3) a singles > doubles > mixed doubles hierarchy; 4) alphabetical order (by family names for players).

Key

To avoid confusion and double counting, these tables should be updated only after an event is completed. The tables are through to the tournaments of the week of September 9.

Titles won by player

Titles won by nation

Titles information
The following players won their first main circuit title in singles, doubles, or mixed doubles:
Singles
 Lara Arruabarrena-Vecino – Bogotá (singles)
 Tímea Babos – Monterrey (singles)
 Mona Barthel – Hobart (singles)
 Kiki Bertens – Fes (singles)
 Irina-Camelia Begu – Tashkent (singles)
 Hsieh Su-wei – Kuala Lumpur (singles)
 Bojana Jovanovski – Baku (singles)
 Angelique Kerber – Paris (singles)
 Heather Watson – Osaka (singles)

Doubles
 Shuko Aoyama – Washington, D.C. (doubles)
 Tímea Babos – Birmingham (doubles)
 Irina-Camelia Begu – Hobart (doubles)
 Irina Buryachok – Baku (doubles)
 Catalina Castaño – Båstad (doubles)
 Mariana Duque Mariño – Båstad (doubles)
 Rika Fujiwara – Copenhagen (doubles)
 Paula Kania – Tashkent (doubles)
 Tatjana Malek – Quebec City (doubles)
 Kristina Mladenovic – Montreal (doubles)
 Polina Pekhova – Tashkent (doubles)
 Magdaléna Rybáriková – Budapest (doubles)
 Lucie Šafářová – Charleston (doubles)
 Valeriya Solovyeva – Baku (doubles)
 Heather Watson – Stanford (doubles)

Mixed doubles
 Bethanie Mattek-Sands – Australian Open (mixed doubles)
 Ekaterina Makarova – US Open (mixed doubles)
The following players defended a main circuit title in singles, doubles, or mixed doubles:
Singles
 Daniela Hantuchová – Pattaya City (singles)
 Polona Hercog – Båstad (singles)
 Maria Sharapova – Rome (singles)
 Serena Williams – Stanford (singles)
Doubles
 Liezel Huber – Dubai (doubles)
 Serena Williams – Olympics (doubles)
 Venus Williams – Olympics (doubles)

Rankings
The Race to the Championships determines the players in the WTA Tour Championships in October. The WTA rankings are based on tournaments of the latest 52 weeks.

Singles
The following is the 2012 top 20 in the Race to the Championships and the top 20 ranked players in the world. Players must include points from the Grand Slams, Premier Mandatory tournaments, the Summer Olympic Games and the WTA Championships. For Top 20 players, their best two results at Premier 5 tournaments will also count. Gold backgrounds indicate players that qualified for the WTA Tour Championships. Blue backgrounds indicate players that qualified as alternates at the WTA Tour Championships.

Number 1 ranking

Doubles
The following is the 2012 top 20 in the Race To The Championships – Doubles and the top 20 individual ranked doubles players. Gold backgrounds indicate teams that have qualified for WTA Tour Championships.

Number 1 ranking

Prize money leaders
The 2012 WTA Tour season was the first, and still only, season where 3 different players earned at least $6,000,000. The 2014 and 2017 seasons each had 3 different players earned at least $5,000,000. The top-16 players earned over $1,000,000.

Statistics leaders

Points distribution

Retirements
 Vasilisa Bardina (born 30 November 1987, in Moscow) turned professional in 2003 with a high singles ranking career of No. 48 on 15 January 2007 and a high doubles ranking career of No. 117 on 25 June 2007.
 Myriam Casanova (born 20 June 1985, in Altstätten) turned professional in 2000 with a high singles ranking career of No. 45 on 7 April 2003 and a high doubles ranking career of No. 19 on 5 July 2004.
 Kim Clijsters (born 8 July 1983, in Bilzen) turned professional in 1997, reaching career-high rankings of World No. 1 in Singles and Doubles. Clijsters has won 41 WTA singles titles and 11 WTA doubles titles. She has won four Grand Slam singles titles: three at the US Open, in 2005, 2009, and 2010 and one at the Australian Open in 2011. She has also been runner-up in four Grand Slam singles tournaments, and won the WTA Tour Championships singles title in 2002, 2003, and 2010. In doubles, she won the French Open and Wimbledon titles in 2003. Clijsters has retired once on 6 May 2007, but almost two years later, on 26 March 2009, she publicly declared her intent to return to the WTA tour for the 2009 summer hard court season. In only her third tournament back, she won her second US Open title, becoming the first unseeded player and wildcard to win the tournament, and the first mother to win a major since Evonne Goolagong in 1980. Clijsters announced in May that her second retirement would occur after the completion of the 2012 US Open
 Julie Ditty (born 4 January 1979, in Atlanta) turned professional in 2002 with a high singles ranking career of No. 89 on 24 March 2008 and a high doubles ranking career of No. 66 on 3 August 2009.
 Gisela Dulko (born January 30, 1985, in Buenos Aires) was a former world no. 1 in doubles turned professional in 2001. Dulko has won 4 WTA singles titles and 17 WTA doubles titles. Dulko won the 2010 WTA Tour Championships and the 2011 Australian Open in doubles, enjoying an 11-year career before announcing her retirement in November 2012.
 Ashley Harkleroad (born 2 May 1985, in Rossville) turned professional in 2000 with a high singles ranking career of No. 39 on 9 June 2003 and a high doubles ranking career of No. 39 on 27 January 2007.
 Svetlana Krivencheva (born 30 December 1973 in Plovdiv) turned professional in 1991 with a high doubles ranking career of No. 69 on 3 August 1998.
 Courtney Nagle (born 29 September 1982) turned professional in 2005 with a high doubles ranking career of No. 97 on 20 April 2009.
 Olivia Sanchez (born 17 November 1982 in Paris) turned professional in 1998 with a high singles ranking career of No. 90 on 9 June 2008. 
 İpek Şenoğlu (born 8 June 1979 in Eskişehir) turned professional in 1996 with a high doubles ranking career of No. 53 on 19 October 2009. 
 Olga Vymetálková (born 24 January 1976) turned professional in 1994 with a high doubles ranking career of No. 82 on 13 September 2004.
 Mashona Washington (born 31 May 1976, in Flint) turned professional in 1995 with a high singles ranking career of No. 50 on 8 November 2004 and a high doubles ranking career of No. 55 on 18 July 2005.
 Jasmin Wöhr (born 21 August 1980 in Tübingen) turned professional in 1999 with a high doubles ranking career of No. 46 on 23 July 2007.

Comebacks
Following are notable players who will comeback after retirements during the 2012 WTA Tour season:
  Paola Suárez (born June 23, 1976, in Buenos Aires), who turned professional in 1991 and has reached a career high ranking of No. 9 on 7 June 2004 in singles and in doubles she was a former world no. 1. She has won 8 doubles Grand Slam (with Virginia Ruano Pascual), 4 singles titles, 44 WTA Tour doubles including 1 WTA Championships. She returned from retirement in 2012, partnering with Gisela Dulko at the 2012 Copa Sony Ericsson Colsanitas, but they lost in the first round. The pair played at the London Summer Olympic Games, where they also lost in the first round.

Awards
The winners of the 2012 WTA Awards were announced throughout the last week of November.

Player of the Year –  Serena Williams
Doubles Team of the Year –  Sara Errani &  Roberta Vinci
Most Improved Player –  Sara Errani
Comeback Player of the Year –  Yaroslava Shvedova
Newcomer of the Year –  Laura Robson
Karen Krantzcke Sportsmanship Award –  Kim Clijsters
Player Service Award –  Venus Williams
Diamond Aces –  Victoria Azarenka
Fan Favorite Singles Player –  Agnieszka Radwańska
Fan Favorite Doubles Team –  Serena Williams &  Venus Williams
Fan Favorite Twitter –  Caroline Wozniacki (Twitter account)
Fan Favorite Facebook –  Agnieszka Radwańska (Facebook account)
Fan Favorite Video – Agnieszka Radwańska & The Bee (video)
Favorite Premier Tournament –  Porsche Tennis Grand Prix (Stuttgart)
Favorite International Tournament –  Sony Swedish Open (Båstad)

See also
2012 ATP World Tour
2012 ATP Challenger Tour
2012 ITF Men's Circuit
2012 WTA 125s
2012 ITF Women's Circuit
Women's Tennis Association
International Tennis Federation

Notes

 Zheng Jie won the final after Flavia Pennetta was forced to retire because of a low back injury.
 Hsieh Su-wei won the final after Petra Martić was forced to retire because of fatigue and cramping.

References

External links
Women's Tennis Association (WTA) official website
International Tennis Federation (ITF) official website

 
WTA Tour
WTA Tour seasons